Catocala moltrechti is a moth of the family Erebidae first described by Otto Bang-Haas in 1927. It is found in south-eastern Siberia.

References

External links
Свиридов, А. В. "ЛЕНТА МОЛЬТРЕХТА - Catocala moltrecht O. Bang-Haas, 1927". ИНФОРМАЦИОННЫЕ СИСТЕМЫ ПО БИОРАЗНООБРАЗИЮ. 

Moths described in 1927
moltrechti
Moths of Asia